Autonomous Systems Technology Related Airborne Evaluation & Assessment (ASTRAEA) is a project to develop unmanned aerial vehicles (UAV) to fly in civil airspace. Both UK government agencies and companies such as AOS Group, BAE Systems, Qinetiq, Rolls-Royce plc, Cassidian, Cobham plc, EADS and Thales UK are involved. The project began in 2006.

Currently, UAVs can only operate in UK airspace under restricted conditions.

ParcAberporth has a centre dedicated to ASTRAEA. Permission has been sought for a permanent segregated airspace around ParcAberporth for testing UAVs over land.

Concerns about safety, privacy and noise were raised during consultative sessions.

Test Flights
Test flights are scheduled to run from May to September 2012 over the Irish Sea. A Jetstream aircraft is being as a UAV and a Piper Seneca as an 'intruder' to test the sense and avoid systems.

In April 2013 the first unmanned flight over British airspace was successfully completed when BAE Systems flew a Jetstream 31 from Warton, Fylde near Preston to Inverness in Scotland. The aircraft, described as the "flying test bed" was controlled by a pilot at Warton using advanced sensors and on-board robotic systems. The flight was not strictly "unmanned" as two pilots flew in the cockpit as a precaution but they were required only to monitor the flight and not to actively engage in any flying. ASTRAEA programme director Lambert Dopping-Hepenstal said: the work being done "will likely impact all of us in the next five, 10, 20 years as unmanned aircraft and associated technology develop and become a part of everyday life". The governments business and energy minister Michael Fallon said: "We welcome this pioneering flight at the end of the ASTRAEA programme. ASTRAEA has made significant achievements, placing the UK industry in a good position globally on unmanned aircraft and the development of regulations for their civil use."

References

External links
Official website via WebArchive

Unmanned aerial vehicle manufacturers of the United Kingdom
2006 establishments in the United Kingdom
British companies established in 2006